Sadio Gassama (born 1954), is a brigadier general in the Malian military. Prior to the 2012 Mali coup d'état, he was the Minister of Internal Security and Civilian Protection and he was reappointed to the cabinet in December, remaining such a minister. On 21 March, he attempted to appease the mutinying soldiers at an army base near the capital of Bamako, but failed to win over the troops in his speech, an incident cited by international news sources as sparking the coup.

He was met with boos and stones were thrown at his car. He was then sequestered, at which point his guards riposted by firing warning shots in the air. The minister was released thanks to the intervention of the Kati zone commander ("commandant de zone"). The soldiers then stormed the weapons and ammunition reserves of the camp. Two soldiers were injured, but the presidency said Gassama was neither injured nor arrested. He briefly served as Defense Minister from February to April 2012.

According to Gassama's official biography, his hobbies include athletics and reading. He speaks French, Russian, Soninke, and Bambara.

References

Living people
Defense ministers of Mali
1954 births
Officers of the National Order of Mali
People from Kayes Region
Malian military personnel
21st-century Malian people